Aistagnostus is a genus of trilobite in the order Agnostida, which existed in what is now Xinjiang, China. It was described by Xiang and Zhang in 1985, and the type species is Aistagnostus laevigatus.

References

Agnostidae
Fossils of China